Veliko Selo may refer to the following places in Serbia

 Veliko Selo (Palilula), suburban settlement of Belgrade
 Veliko Selo (Loznica)
 Veliko Selo (Malo Crniće)
 Veliko Selo (Pirot)